Morari Bapu (Moraridas Prabhudas Hariyani) is an Indian spiritual leader and preacher from Gujarat who is known for his discourses on Ramcharitmanas across various cities in India and abroad.

Early life
Morari Bapu was born on 19 February 1947 (Shivaratri according to Hindu calendar) in Talgajarda village near Mahuva, Gujarat, to Prabhudas Bapu Hariyani and Savitri Ben Hariyani, in a family of six brothers and two sisters. His family followed Nimbarka Sampradaya, a Hindu Vaishnava tradition. He considers his grandfather Tribhovandas Hariyani as his guru, spiritual teacher, and learnt Ramcharitmanas from him at a place now known as Chitrakutdham. He memorized the chaupais (couplets) while travelling from Talgajarda to primary and secondary schools in Mahuva.

After completing secondary education, he joined Shahpur Teachers Training College in Junagadh. Later he joined a primary school in Pauva as a teacher in 1966.

Career 
At the age of 14, he gave his first discourse on Ramcharitmanas under Ramfaldas Maharaj at a nine-day discourse held at Dhanfulia, a village in Gujarat. Since then, Morari Bapu has performed 800+ Ramkathas, each of nine days based upon a particular verse from Ramcharitmanas. He has also narrated upon 19 verses of the reverend Gopi Geet (each verse discourse of seven days). His Katha, always went through its journey with two vital aspects - "Bhajan"(Prayers) and "Bhojan Prasad"(meals/blessed food/sacrament). He gave his first discourse abroad in Nairobi in 1976. He gives discourses (kathaas) in Gujarati and Hindi in India and  abroad. He has given discourses in the United States, United Kingdom, South Africa, Kenya, Uganda, Cambodia, Jordan, Muscat as well as on a cruise ship in the Mediterranean Sea, and on an airplane travelling the world, in Vatican City and on the foothills of Mount Kailash in China.

Views and Philanthropy 
Bapu, who believes in ‘Pravahi Parampara’ (flowing tradition), has been speaking for progressive norms in the 21st century and feels there should be no stagnancy in religious beliefs. Bapu has tried to reach the "last-man" whenever and wherever possible along his 60-year journey at various places. He has also visited people in Jail (like Bhavnagar, Rajkot, Buxur, Sabarmati)

Katha in Ayodhya

In the interview with the Times Now, Morari Bapu  said that it is his motive to make Ram Katha (Story of Rama) accessible to the neglected, exploited and marginalised segments of society, just as Ram himself went to the Shabris, Nishads and Sugareevas of that time". In the December month of 2018, Morari Bapu had organised the Ram Katha among sex workers in Ayodhya and he pledged ₹3 crore for the welfare of sex workers. In the last, he distributed ₹6.92 crore (69.2 million) for welfare of the sex workers in which he added ₹11 lakh (1.1 million) of his own. Morari Bapu's discourse to sex workers in the Ayodhya was criticised by several Hindu religious and spiritual leaders. He responded that he would addressing a deprived section of society and cited that Rama's life was based on acceptance and reforms. Morari Bapu was the first spiritual leader to meet sex workers in the Mumbai.

Morari Bapu had supported the construction of temple of Rama on the disputed site in Ayodhya. In 1992, he attended the event organised by Rashtriya Swayamsevak Sangh and appealed youth to 'fight' and to be 'martyred' for the Rama Temple. In a TV show, Aap Ki Adalat, he appealed the Supreme Court of India not to delay the judgement regarding the temple. In July 2020, during his discourse at Pithoria Dham located near his village, Morari Bapu announced  donation for the construction of Ram Janmabhoomi temple and urged his followers to contribute as well. He contributed  with help of his followers, becoming the highest donor.

In 2017, he had organised a discourse in Surat to help the families of army personnel who had died in the conflict. He announced an aid of ₹1 lakh to the family of each Central Reserve Police Force personnel killed in the 2019 Pulwama attack.

Katha for various social causes

Bapu has been actively contributing to various possible social causes based upon the need of an hour. For Example:

 Ram katha has contributed around 10 crore to Uttarakhand floods and re-construction of Kedarnath temple in 2014. He went to Uttarakhand himself and donated the cheques to victims.
He also done katha for Sree LalluBhai Arogya Mandir at Savar Kundla, Gujarat in 2017. The amount raised by devotees was submitted to the trust directly during this katha and the organization now does not accept any expenses from the patients.
 Bapu initiated the idea during the katha discourse itself and got 95 couples married on 8th day of Ramkatha in Prayagraj, Uttar Pradesh in March 2020. Apart from this, He arranges for "Samuh Lagna" (an occasion where multiple marriages take place together) every year for the needy at SenjalDham,Gujarat. 
Bapu has also supported Akshaya Patra Foundation and conducted Ram Katha in Kolkata in 2012. In this katha 4 crores have been raised by Bapu and his devotees.
A Katha has been conducted to fight for cancer and money raised has been donated to Gujarat Cancer Society in December 2012. (Approx 3 Crores donated)
In 2015, Bapu conducted a 9-day katha for kidney patients conducted by Institute of Kidney Diseases and Research Centre (IKRDC) and Dr H L Trivedi Institute of Transplantation Sciences at Sabarmati, Gujarat. This katha donated 5 crores to these institutes. This is one of the first ever spiritual programs for kidney patients.

References

External links

Official website

Bhakti movement
1946 births
Living people
Gujarati people
Indian Hindu spiritual teachers
Indian storytellers